Catawba Station (also known as Catawba) is an unincorporated community in Champaign County, in the U.S. state of Ohio.

History
Catawba Station had its start as a station and shipping point on the Big Four Railroad, but the community never outgrew its original purpose.

References

Unincorporated communities in Champaign County, Ohio
Unincorporated communities in Ohio